The 2001 Asian Women's Volleyball Championship was the eleventh edition of the Asian Championship, a biennial international volleyball tournament organised by the Asian Volleyball Confederation (AVC) with Thailand Volleyball Association (TVA). The tournament was held in Nakhon Ratchasima, Thailand from 23 to 30 September 2001.

Pools composition
The teams are seeded based on their final ranking at the 1999 Asian Women's Volleyball Championship.

''* Withdrew

Preliminary round

Pool A

|}

|}

Pool B

|}

|}

Classification 5th–8th

Semifinals

|}

7th place

|}

5th place

|}

Final round

Semifinals

|}

3rd place

|}

Final

|}

Final standing

References
Results (Archived 2009-05-14)

International volleyball competitions hosted by Thailand
2001 in women's volleyball
2001
Volleyball,Asian Women's Championship